Susan Kandel is an American author of a series of mystery books set in Los Angeles featuring sleuth CeCe Caruso, a vintage clothing fashionista and biographer of mystery writers.

Kandel's background is in art history, having been an art critic, university teacher and editor of an art journal.

Books
I Dreamed I Married Perry Mason
Not a Girl Detective
Shamus in the Green Room
Christietown: a novel about Vintage clothing, Romance, Mystery and Agatha Christie
Dial H for Hitchcock

See also
List of female detective/mystery writers
List of female detective characters

References

External links
Official website

Living people
American mystery writers
American women novelists
American art critics
Year of birth missing (living people)
20th-century American novelists
American women journalists
Women mystery writers
American women critics
20th-century American women writers
20th-century American non-fiction writers
21st-century American women